NSSB can refer to the following:

National Socialist Schoolchildren's League (Nationalsozialistischer Schülerbund), also known under the acronym "NSS"
Swiss National Socialist League (Nationalsozialistischer Schweizerbund)